The 1995 Atlantic hurricane season was an event in the annual tropical cyclone season in the north Atlantic Ocean. This Atlantic hurricane season saw a near-record number of named tropical storms. This extremely active season followed four consecutive years in which there was below normal activity. The season officially began on June 1, 1995 and ended on November 30, 1995. These dates, adopted by convention, historically describe the period in each year when most tropical systems form. The season's first system, Hurricane Allison, developed on June 3; its last, Hurricane Tanya, became extratropical on November 2.

The season produced 21 tropical cyclones, of which 19 intensified into tropical storms, 11 of which became hurricanes, and five became major hurricanes. The four most notable storms during the season were hurricanes Luis, Marilyn, Opal and Roxanne. Luis caused extensive damage in the northern Leeward Islands in excess of $2.5 billion (1995 USD). Marilyn affected the same area a few days later, causing eight deaths and damages in excess of $2 billion in the U.S. Virgin Islands. Opal was a strong hurricane that, after battering the Yucatán Peninsula of Mexico, cross the Gulf of Mexico and made landfall near Pensacola Beach, Florida. There were 27 hurricane-related deaths were reported in the Southeastern United States. Roxanne caused widespread flooding and crop damage throughout much of the Yucatán Peninsula, and killed at least six people, due to its erratic movement. Following the 1995 season, these four storm names were retired from reuse in the North Atlantic by the World Meteorological Organization.

This timeline documents tropical cyclone formations, strengthening, weakening, landfalls, extratropical transitions, and dissipations during the season. It includes information that was not released throughout the season, meaning that data from post-storm reviews by the National Hurricane Center, such as a storm that was not initially warned upon, has been included.

By convention, meteorologists use one time zone when issuing forecasts and making observations: Coordinated Universal Time (UTC), and also use the 24-hour clock (where 00:00 = midnight UTC). In this time line, all information is listed by UTC first with the respective local time included in parentheses.

Timeline

June

June 1
 The 1995 Atlantic hurricane season officially begins.

June 3
 00:00 UTC (8:00 p.m.
 12:00 UTC (8:00 a.m. EDT)Tropical Depression One strengthens into Tropical Storm Allison while moving through the Yucatán Channel.

June 4
 12:00 UTC (8:00 a.m.

June 5
 06:00 UTC (2:00 a.m. EDT)Hurricane Allison weakens to a tropical storm as it approaches the Florida Gulf coast.
 14:00 UTC (10:00 a.m.
 15:00 UTC (11:00 a.m.

June 6
 00:00 UTC (8:00 p.m. EDT June 5)Tropical Storm Allison weakens to a tropical depression over southeastern Georgia.
 06:00 UTC (2:00 a.m. EDT)Tropical Depression Allison transitions into an extratropical cyclone while tracking across the Carolinas, and subsequently dissipates over the Labrador Sea.

July

July 6
 18:00 UTC (2:00 p.m. AST)Tropical Depression Two forms from a frontal low-pressure area while located about 425 mi (685 km) west of Bermuda.

July 7
 06:00 UTC (2:00 a.m. AST)Tropical Depression Two intensifies into Tropical Storm Barry while located west-southwest of Bermuda.
 21:00 UTC (5:00 p.m.

July 9
 21:30 UTC (5:30 p.m.
 22:00 UTC (6:00 p.m.

July 10
 00:00 UTC (8:00 p.m. AST, July 9)Tropical Storm Barry attains its minimum barometric pressure of  while over the Gulf of Saint Lawrence.
 06:00 UTC (2:00 a.m. AST)Tropical Storm Barry transitions into an extratropical cyclone near the western coast of Newfoundland and later dissipates.

July 12
 00:00 UTC (8:00 p.m. AST, July 11)Tropical Depression Three forms from a tropical wave while located a few hundred miles east of the Lesser Antilles.

July 14
 00:00 UTC (8:00 p.m.

July 17
 00:00 UTC (8:00 p.m.

July 20
 18:00 UTC (2:00 p.m. AST)Tropical Storm Chantal transitions into an extratropical cyclone roughly 225 miles (360 km) east-southeast of Cape Race, Newfoundland and subsequently dissipates.

July 28
 18:00 UTC (1:00 p.m.

July 30
 18:00 UTC (1:00 p.m.

July 31
 00:00 UTC (7:00 p.m.
 00:00 UTC (8:00 p.m. EDT, July 30)Tropical Storm Erin forms from a tropical wave just west of Turks and Caicos Islands.
 02:00 UTC (9:00 p.m.
 06:00 UTC (1:00 a.m.

August

August 1
 00:00 UTC (8:00 p.m. EDT, July 31)Tropical Storm Erin intensifies into a Category 1 hurricane near Rum Cay, Bahamas.

August 2
 06:15 UTC (2:15 a.m.
 12:00 UTC (8:00 a.m. EDT)Hurricane Erin weakens to a tropical storm over Central Florida.

August 3
 00:00 UTC (8:00 p.m. EDT, August 2)Tropical Storm Erin re-intensifies into a Category 1 hurricane after emerging into the eastern Gulf of Mexico.
 13:30 UTC (8:30 a.m.
 16:00 UTC (11:00 a.m. CDT)Hurricane Erin weakens into a Category 1 hurricane due to interaction with Santa Rosa Island.
 16:00 UTC (11:00 p.m.

August 4
 00:00 UTC (7:00 p.m. CDT, August 3)Hurricane Erin weakens to a tropical storm over southeastern Mississippi.
 12:00 UTC (7:00 a.m. CDT)Tropical Storm Erin weakens to a tropical depression.

August 5
 18:00 UTC (1:00 p.m. CDT)Tropical Depression Six develops over the southwestern Gulf of Mexico from the southern part of the tropical wave that spawned Hurricane Erin.

August 6
 12:00 UTC (8:00 a.m. EDT)Tropical Depression Erin merges with an extratropical frontal system over West Virginia.
 23:00 UTC (6:00 p.m.

August 7
 00:00 UTC (7:00 p.m.
 18:00 UTC (1:00 p.m. CDT)Tropical Depression Six dissipates over the mountains of central-southern Mexico.

August 8
 00:00 UTC (8:00 p.m.
 18:00 UTC (2:00 p.m. AST)Tropical Depression Seven intensifies into Tropical Storm Felix.

August 9
 18:00 UTC (1:00 p.m.

August 10
 12:00 UTC (7:00 a.m. CDT)Tropical Depression Eight intensifies into Tropical Storm Gabrielle.

August 11
 00:00 UTC (8:00 p.m.
 18:00 UTC (2:00 p.m. AST)Hurricane Felix intensifies into a Category 2 hurricane.
 20:00 UTC (3:00 p.m.

August 12
 00:00 UTC (8:00 p.m. AST, August 11)Hurricane Felix rapidly intensifies into a Category 3 hurricane.
 00:00 UTC (7:00 p.m.
 12:00 UTC (8:00 a.m. AST) Hurricane Felix rapidly intensifies into a Category 4 hurricane.
 18:00 UTC (2:00 p.m.

August 13
 06:00 UTC (2:00 a.m. AST)Hurricane Felix weakens to a Category 3 hurricane.
 18:00 UTC (2:00 p.m. AST)Hurricane Felix weakens to a Category 2 hurricane.

August 14
 06:00 UTC (2:00 a.m. AST)Hurricane Felix weakens to a Category 1 hurricane.

August 20
 06:00 UTC (2:00 a.m. AST)Hurricane Felix weakens to a tropical storm northeast of Bermuda.

August 22
 00:00 UTC (8:00 p.m.
 06:00 UTC (2:00 a.m. AST)Tropical Depression Nine intensifies into Tropical Storm Humberto.
 12:00 UTC (8:00 a.m.
 18:00 UTC (2:00 p.m.
 18:00 UTC (2:00 p.m. AST)Tropical Depression Ten intensifies into Tropical Storm Iris.
 18:00 UTC (2:00 p.m. EDT)Tropical Depression Eleven develops from a tropical wave while located just southwest of Andros Island in the Bahamas.

August 23
 06:00 UTC (2:00 a.m. AST)Tropical Storm Humberto intensifies into a Category 1 hurricane west of the Cape Verde Islands.
 12:00 UTC (8:00 a.m.
 18:00 UTC (2:00 p.m. AST)Tropical Storm Iris intensifies into a Category 1 hurricane.
 18:00 UTC (2:00 p.m.

August 24
 18:00 UTC (2:00 p.m.
 18:00 UTC (2:00 p.m. AST)Hurricane Iris weakens to a tropical storm.
 18:00 UTC (2:00 p.m.

August 26
 00:00 UTC (8:00 p.m.
 12:00 UTC (8:00 a.m.
 18:00 UTC (2:00 p.m. AST)Hurricane Humberto weakens to a Category 1 hurricane.
 18:00 UTC (2:00 p.m.

August 27
 09:00–12:00 UTC (5:00–8:00 a.m. AST)Tropical Storm Iris makes landfall on the islands of Guadeloupe with winds of 50 miles per hour (80 km/h).
 18:00 UTC (2:00 p.m.
 23:00 UTC (7:00 p.m.

August 28
 06:00 UTC (2:00 a.m. EDT)Tropical Depression Jerry merges with an extratropical trough while situated near the Georgia–South Carolina state line east of Atlanta.
 06:00 UTC (2:00 a.m. AST)Tropical Depression Twelve strengthens into Tropical Storm Karen.
 18:00 UTC (2:00 p.m. AST)Tropical Storm Iris re-intensifies into a Category 1 hurricane.
 18:00 UTC (2:00 p.m.

August 29
 00:00 UTC (8:00 p.m.
 00:00 UTC (8:00 p.m. AST, August 28)Tropical Depression Thirteen intensifies into Tropical Storm Luis.

August 30
 18:00 UTC (2:00 p.m. AST)Tropical Storm Luis intensifies into a Category 1 hurricane.

August 31
 12:00 UTC (8:00 a.m. AST)Hurricane Luis intensifies into a Category 2 hurricane.
 18:00 UTC (2:00 p.m. AST)Hurricane Humberto weakens to a tropical storm in the central Atlantic.

September

September 1
 00:00 UTC (8:00 p.m. AST, August 31)Hurricane Luis intensifies into a Category 3 hurricane.
 06:00 UTC (2:00 a.m. AST)Tropical Storm Humberto becomes absorbed within a larger extratropical low.
 06:00 UTC (2:00 a.m.
 12:00 UTC (8:00 a.m.

September 2
 12:00 UTC (8:00 a.m. AST)Hurricane Iris weakens to a Category 1 hurricane several hundred miles southeast of Bermuda.
 12:00 UTC (8:00 a.m. AST)Tropical Storm Karen weakens to a tropical depression while located east of Bermuda.

September 3
 06:00 UTC (2:00 a.m. AST)Tropical Depression Karen is absorbed by Hurricane Iris.
 06:00 UTC (2:00 a.m. AST)Hurricane Luis attains its maximum sustained wind speed of 140 mph (220 km/h).

September 4
 06:00 UTC (2:00 a.m. AST)Hurricane Iris weakens to a tropical storm.
 12:00 UTC (8:00 a.m. AST)Tropical Storm Iris transitions into an extratropical cyclone while centered southeast of Newfoundland.

September 5
 12:00 UTC (8:00 a.m. AST)Hurricane Luis makes landfall on Barbuda with winds of 130 mph (215 km/h).

September 7
 18:00 UTC (2:00 p.m. AST)Hurricane Luis weakens to a Category 3 hurricane.

September 8
 00:00 UTC (8:00 p.m.

September 9
 00:00 UTC (8:00 p.m. AST, September 8)Hurricane Luis weakens to a Category 2 hurricane west of Bermuda.
 12:00 UTC (8:00 a.m. AST)Tropical Depression Fourteen develops from a tropical wave about halfway between the Cape Verde Islands and the Lesser Antilles.

September 10
 12:00 UTC (8:00 a.m. AST)Hurricane Luis weakens to a Category 1 hurricane.

September 11
 12:00 UTC (8:00 a.m. AST)Hurricane Luis makes landfall on the Avalon Peninsula of Newfoundland with winds of 90 mph (150 km/h).
 18:00 UTC (2:00 p.m. AST)Hurricane Luis transitions into an extratropical cyclone while located northeast of Newfoundland and is subsequently absorbed by a trough near the southern coast of Greenland.

September 12
 18:00 UTC (2:00 p.m.

September 13
 00:00 UTC (8:00 p.m. AST, September 12)Tropical Depression Fifteen strengthens into Tropical Storm Marilyn.
 18:00 UTC (2:00 p.m. AST)Tropical Depression Fourteen dissipates about 495 mi (795 km) south-southeast of Bermuda.

September 14
 00:00 UTC (8:00 p.m. AST, September 13)Tropical Storm Marilyn strengthens into a Category 1 hurricane.
 21:00 UTC (5:00 p.m. AST)Hurricane Marilyn makes landfall on Dominica with winds of 80 mph (130 km/h).
 23:00–00:00 UTC (7:00–8:00 p.m. AST)Hurricane Marilyn's eyewall strikes the islands of Guadeloupe with winds of 80 mph (130 km/h).

September 15
 18:00 UTC (2:00 p.m. AST)Hurricane Marilyn strengthens into a Category 2 hurricane.
 21:00 UTC (5:00 p.m.

September 16
 04:30 UTC (00:30 a.m.
 18:00 UTC (2:00 p.m. AST) Hurricane Marilyn strengthens into a Category 3 hurricane.

September 17
 03:00 UTC (11:00 p.m.
 06:00 UTC (2:00 a.m. AST)Hurricane Marilyn weakens to a Category 2 hurricane.
 12:00 UTC (8:00 a.m. AST)Hurricane Marilyn weakens to a Category 1 hurricane.

September 18
 00:00 UTC (8:00 p.m. AST, September 17)Hurricane Marilyn re-strengthens into a Category 2 hurricane several hundred miles (km) south-southwest of Bermuda.
 18:00 UTC (2:00 p.m. AST)Hurricane Marilyn weakens to a Category 1 hurricane.

September 21
 18:00 UTC (2:00 p.m. AST)Hurricane Marilyn weakens to a tropical storm.

September 22
 06:00 UTC (2:00 a.m.

September 26
 18:00 UTC (2:00 p.m.

September 27
 12:00 UTC (8:00 a.m. AST)Tropical Depression Sixteen intensifies into Tropical Storm Noel over the eastern Atlantic.
 18:00 UTC (2:00 p.m.

September 28
 00:00 UTC (8:00 p.m. EDT, September 27)Tropical Depression Seventeen makes landfall in a rural area of Felipe Carrillo Puerto, Quintana Roo with winds of 30 mph (45 km/h).
 18:00 UTC (2:00 p.m.

September 30
 12:00 UTC (8:00 a.m. AST)Hurricane Noel weakens to a tropical storm far to the south-southwest of the Azores.
 12:00 UTC (8:00 a.m. EDT)Tropical Depression Seventeen strengthens into Tropical Storm Opal over land, while approaching the Gulf coast of the Yucatán Peninsula east-northeast of Mérida, Yucatán.

October

October 2
 12:00 UTC (7:00 a.m.

October 3
 18:00 UTC (1:00 p.m. CDT)Hurricane Opal strengthens into a Category 2 hurricane.

October 4
 00:00 UTC (7:00 p.m. CDT, October 3)Hurricane Opal strengthens into a Category 3 hurricane.
 10:00 UTC (5:00 a.m.
 18:00 UTC (1:00 p.m. CDT)Hurricane Opal weakens to a Category 3 hurricane.
 18:00 UTC (2:00 p.m.
 22:00 UTC (5:00 p.m. CDT)Hurricane Opal makes landfall near Pensacola Beach, Florida with winds of 115 mph (185 km/h).

October 5
 00:00 UTC (8:00 p.m.
 00:00 UTC (7:00 p.m. CDT, October 4)Hurricane Opal rapidly weakens to a Category 1 hurricane.
 06:00 UTC (1:00 a.m. CDT)Hurricane Opal weakens to a tropical storm over southern Alabama.
 12:00 UTC (7:00 a.m. CDT)Tropical Storm Opal weakens to a tropical depression over southeastern Tennessee.
 12:00 UTC (8:00 a.m. AST)Tropical Depression Eighteen strengthens into Tropical Storm Pablo.
 18:00 UTC (2:00 p.m. EDT)Tropical Depression Opal transitions into an extratropical cyclone while located over northeastern Kentucky.

October 6
 00:00 UTC (8:00 p.m.
 06:00 UTC (2:00 a.m.

October 7
 06:00 UTC (2:00 a.m.
 18:00 UTC (2:00 p.m. AST)Tropical Depression Nineteen develops from a tropical wave while located just east of the Caribbean coast Nicaragua near the Miskito Cays.

October 8
 12:00 UTC (8:00 a.m. AST) Tropical Storm Pablo weakens to a tropical depression.
 18:00 UTC (2:00 p.m.

October 9
 00:00 UTC (8:00 p.m. EDT, October 8)Tropical Depression Nineteen intensifies into Tropical Storm Roxanne.

October 10
 06:00 UTC (2:00 a.m.
 18:00 UTC (2:00 p.m. EDT)Hurricane Roxanne intensifies into a Category 2 hurricane.
 22:00 UTC (6:00 p.m.

October 11
 02:00 UTC (9:00 p.m.
 06:00 UTC (1:00 a.m. CDT)Hurricane Roxanne weakens to a Category 2 hurricane over the Yucatán Peninsula of Mexico.
 12:00 UTC (7:00 a.m. CDT)Hurricane Roxanne weakens to a Category 1 hurricane over land.

October 12
 12:00 UTC (7:00 a.m. CDT)Hurricane Roxanne weakens to a tropical storm as it emerges into the Bay of Campeche.

October 14
 12:00 UTC (7:00 a.m. CDT)Tropical Storm Roxanne re-intensifies into a Category 1 hurricane in the Bay of Campeche.

October 17
 06:00 UTC (1:00 a.m.

October 19
 00:00 UTC (7:00 p.m.

October 20
 12:00 UTC (8:00 a.m.

October 21
 00:00 UTC (7:00 p.m. CDT, October 20)Tropical Depression Roxanne dissipates while moving southwestward toward Veracruz.
 00:00 UTC (8:00 p.m. AST October 20)Tropical Depression Twenty strengthens into Tropical Storm Sebastien.

October 22
 18:00 UTC (2:00 p.m.

October 24
 00:00 UTC (8:00 p.m. AST, October 23)Tropical Storm Sebastien weakens to a tropical depression.
 07:00 UTC (3:00 a.m.

October 25
 00:00 UTC (8:00 p.m. AST, October 24)Tropical Depression Sebastien dissipates near Saint Croix, U.S. Virgin Islands.

October 27
 00:00 UTC (8:00 p.m.
 12:00 UTC (8:00 a.m. AST)Tropical Depression Twenty-One strengthens into Tropical Storm Tanya.

October 29
 12:00 UTC (8:00 a.m. AST)Tropical Storm Tanya strengthens into a Category 1 hurricane.

October 31
 06:00 UTC (2:00 a.m.

November

November 1
 12:00 UTC (8:00 a.m. AST)Hurricane Tanya weakens to a tropical storm.

November 2
 00:00 UTC (8:00 p.m. AST, November 1)Tropical Storm Tanya transitions into an extratropical cyclone while located just northwest of Graciosa Island, Azores and is subsequently absorbed into a larger low pressure system.

November 30
 The 1995 Atlantic hurricane season officially ends.

See also

 Lists of Atlantic hurricanes

Notes

References

Further reading
 

1995 Atlantic hurricane season
Articles which contain graphical timelines